

Players

Competitions

Division Three

League table

Results summary

League position by match

Matches

Play-offs

FA Cup

Coca-Cola Cup

Auto Windscreens Shield

Appearances, goals and cards

References

Books

1996-97
Northampton Town
Northampton Town